In the 10th edition of Systema Naturae, Carl Linnaeus classified the arthropods, including insects, arachnids and crustaceans, among his class "Insecta". Butterflies and moths were brought together under the name Lepidoptera. Linnaeus divided the group into three genera – Papilio, Sphinx and Phalaena. The first two, together with the seven subdivisions of the third, are now used as the basis for nine superfamily names: Papilionoidea, Sphingoidea, Bombycoidea, Noctuoidea, Geometroidea, Tortricoidea, Pyraloidea, Tineoidea and Alucitoidea.

Themes
When naming the nearly 200 species of butterflies known to him at the time, Linnaeus used names from classical mythology as specific names. These were thematically arranged into six groups, and were drawn from classical sources including the Fabulae of Gaius Julius Hyginus and Pliny the Elder's Naturalis Historia. The first such group was the Equites, or knights, which were divided into the Equites Trojani (Trojan army) and Equites Achivi (Achaean army), and between them named most of the figures involved in the Trojan War. The second group was the Heliconii, comprising Apollo and Muses. The third group was the Danai, divided into the Danai Candidi and the Danai Festivi, representing the Danaids and their husbands. The fourth group was the Nymphales, or nymphs, divided into the Nymphales gemmati and the Nymphales phalerati, on the basis of the insects' wing markings. The fifth group, the Plebeji, were divided into Plebeji Rurales and Plebeji Urbicolae. There is little thematic connection between their names. The final group was the Barbari, or Argonauts.

Papilio (butterflies)

Equites Trojani

Papilio priamus – Ornithoptera priamus
Papilio hector – Pachliopta hector
Papilio paris – Papilio paris
Papilio helenus – Papilio helenus
Papilio troilus – Papilio troilus, spicebush swallowtail
Papilio deiphobus – Papilio deiphobus
Papilio polytes – Papilio polytes, common Mormon
Papilio pammon – Papilio polytes
Papilio glaucus – Papilio glaucus, eastern tiger swallowtail
Papilio anchises – Parides anchises
Papilio polydamas – Battus polydamas
Papilio memnon – Papilio memnon, great Mormon
Papilio agenor – subspecies of Papilio memnon, great Mormon
Papilio sarpedon – Graphium sarpedon
Papilio aeneas – Parides aeneas
Papilio panthous – Ornithoptera priamus
Papilio pandarus – Hypolimnas pandarus

Equites Achivi

Papilio helena – Troides helena
Papilio menelaus – Morpho menelaus
Papilio ulysses – Papilio ulysses
Papilio agamemnon – Graphium agamemnon
Papilio diomedes – Papilio ulysses
Papilio patroclus – Lyssa patroclus (a moth)
Papilio pyrrhus – Polyura pyrrhus
Papilio leilus – Urania leilus (a moth)
Papilio ajax – [rejected]
Papilio machaon – Papilio machaon, Old World swallowtail
Papilio antilochus – Papilio glaucus
Papilio protesilaus – Protesilaus protesilaus
Papilio nestor – Morpho menelaus
Papilio telemachus – Morpho telemachus
Papilio achilles – Morpho achilles
Papilio podalirius – Iphiclides podalirius
Papilio teucer – Caligo teucer
Papilio idomeneus – Caligo idomeneus
Papilio demoleus – Papilio demoleus
Papilio demophon – Archaeoprepona demophon
Papilio eurypylus – Graphium eurypylus
Papilio nireus – Papilio nireus
Papilio stelenes – Siproeta stelenes
Papilio philoctetes – Antirrhea philoctetes

Heliconii

Papilio apollo – Parnassius apollo, Apollo
Papilio mnemosyne – Parnassius mnemosyne, clouded Apollo
Papilio piera – Haetera piera
Papilio aglaja – [rejected]
Papilio terpsicore – [nomen dubium]
Papilio calliope – Stalachtis calliope
Papilio polymnia – Mechanitis polymnia
Papilio urania – Taenaris urania
Papilio euterpe – Stalachtis euterpe
Papilio ricini – Heliconius ricini
Papilio psidii – Thyridia psidii
Papilio clio – Eresia clio
Papilio thalia – Actinote thalia
Papilio erato – Heliconius doris
Papilio melpomene – Heliconius melpomene

Danai candidi

Papilio anacardii – Protogoniomorpha anacardii
Papilio crataegi – Aporia crataegi, black-veined white
Papilio brassicae – Pieris brassicae, large white
Papilio rapae – Pieris rapae, small white
Papilio napi – Pieris napi, green-veined white
Papilio sinapis – Leptidea sinapis, wood white
Papilio daplidice – Pontia daplidice, Bath white
Papilio cardamines – Anthocharis cardamines, orange tip
Papilio euippe – Colotis euippe, round-winged orange tip
Papilio glaucippe – Hebomoia glaucippe
Papilio pyranthe – Catopsilia pyranthe
Papilio arsalte – Heliopetes arsalte
Papilio hyparete – Delias hyparete
Papilio damone – [nomen dubium]
Papilio trite – Rhabdodryas trite
Papilio hyale – Colias hyale, pale clouded yellow
Papilio sennae – Phoebis sennae, cloudless sulphur
Papilio rhamni – Gonepteryx rhamni, common brimstone
Papilio hecabe – Eurema hecabe

Danai festivi

Papilio midamus – Euploea midamus
Papilio niavius – Amauris niavius
Papilio enceladus – [nomen dubium]
Papilio obrinus – Nessaea obrinus
Papilio perius – Parathyma perius
Papilio plexippus – Danaus plexippus, monarch
Papilio chrysippus – Danaus chrysippus
Papilio cassiae – Opsiphanes cassiae
Papilio sophorae – Brassolis sophorae
Papilio mineus – Mycalesis mineus
Papilio hyperantus – Aphantopus hyperantus, the ringlet
Papilio pamphilus – Coenonympha pamphilus, small heath
Papilio xanthus – Catoblepia xanthus

Nymphales gemmati

Papilio io – Aglais io
Papilio almana – Junonia almana
Papilio asterie – Junonia almana
Papilio aonis – Junonia lemonias
Papilio oenone – Junonia oenone
Papilio lemonias – Junonia lemonias
Papilio orithya – Junonia orithya
Papilio feronia – Hamadryas feronia
Papilio maera – Lasiommata maera, large wall
Papilio ligea – Erebia ligea
Papilio aegeria – Pararge aegeria, speckled wood
Papilio galathea – Melanargia galathea, marbled white
Papilio cyrene – Salamis anacardii
Papilio semele – Hipparchia semele, grayling
Papilio leda – Melanitis leda
Papilio helie – [nomen dubium]
Papilio jurtina – Maniola jurtina, meadow brown
Papilio aeropa – Lexias aeropa
Papilio janira – Maniola janira
Papilio cardui – Vanessa cardui, painted lady
Papilio pipleis – Hypolimnas pandarus
Papilio lampetia – Cupha lampetia
Papilio iris – Apatura iris, purple emperor

Nymphales phalerati
Papilio populi – Limenitis populi, poplar admiral
Papilio antiopa – Nymphalis antiopa, Camberwell beauty
Papilio polychloros – Nymphalis polychloros, large tortoiseshell
Papilio urticae – Aglais urticae, small tortoiseshell
Papilio c-album – Polygonia c-album, comma
Papilio c-aureum – Polygonia c-aureum
Papilio dirce – Colobura dirce
Papilio amathea – Anartia amathea
Papilio atalanta – Vanessa atalanta
Papilio venilia – Pantoporia venilia
Papilio alimena – Hypolimnas alimena
Papilio leucothoe – Athyma perius
Papilio phaetusa – Dryadula phaetusa
Papilio bolina – Hypolimnas bolina
Papilio clytia – Papilio clytia
Papilio neaerea – Pyrrhogyra neaerea
Papilio acesta – Tigridia acesta
Papilio similis – Ideopsis similis
Papilio assimilis – Hestina assimilis
Papilio dissimilis – Papilio clytia
Papilio panope – Papilio clytia
Papilio rumina – Zerynthia rumina
Papilio levana – Araschnia levana, map (spring generation)
Papilio prorsa – Araschnia levana, map (summer generations)
Papilio lucina – Hamearis lucina
Papilio maturna – Euphydryas maturna, scarce fritillary
Papilio cinxia – Melitaea cinxia, Glanville fritillary
Papilio paphia – Argynnis paphia
Papilio cytherea – Adelpha cytherea
Papilio aglaja – Speyeria aglaja, dark green fritillary
Papilio lathonia – Issoria lathonia
Papilio euphrosyne – Boloria euphrosyne
Papilio niobe – Fabriciana niobe
Papilio vanillae – Agraulis vanillae

Plebeji rurales

Papilio cupido – Helicopis cupido
Papilio betulae – Thecla betulae, brown hairstreak
Papilio pruni – Satyrium pruni, black hairstreak
Papilio quercus – Quercusia quercus, purple hairstreak
Papilio marsyas – Pseudolycaena marsyas
Papilio thamyras – Arhopala thamyras
Papilio arion – Maculinea arion, large blue
Papilio argus – Plebejus argus, silver-studded blue
Papilio argiolus – Celastrina argiolus, holly blue
Papilio rubi – Callophrys rubi, green hairstreak
Papilio philocles – Mesosemia philocles
Papilio timantes – [nomen dubium]
Papilio athemon – Dynamine athemon
Papilio caricae – Nymphidium caricae
Papilio phereclus – Panara phereclus
Papilio lysippus – Riodina lysippus
Papilio virgaureae – Lycaena virgaureae, scarce copper

Plebeji urbicolae

Papilio comma – Hesperia comma
Papilio proteus – Urbanus proteus, long-tailed skipper
Papilio phidias – Pyrrhopyge phidias
Papilio bixae – Pyrrhopyge phidias
Papilio polycletus – Hypochrysops polycletus
Papilio malvae – Pyrgus malvae, grizzled skipper
Papilio tages – Erynnis tages, dingy skipper

Barbari

Papilio bates – Colobura dirce
Papilio tiphus – Pyrrhogyra neaerea
Papilio jason – [nomen dubium]
Papilio iphiclus – Adelpha iphiclus
Papilio hylas – Neptis hylas
Papilio idmon – [nomen dubium]
Papilio ancaeus – Nessaea obrinus
Papilio eleus – Adelpha cytherea
Papilio amphion – Phaedyma amphion
Papilio telamon – Cyrestis telamon
Papilio eribotes – [nomen dubium]
Papilio eurytus – Pseudacraea eurytus
Papilio ceneus – Delias ceneus
Papilio mopsus – Mechanitis polymnia
Papilio cepheus – Acraea cepheus
Papilio zetes – Acraea zetes
Papilio priassus – Entheus priassus
Papilio acastus – [nomen dubium]
Papilio neleus – Hyalothyrus neleus
Papilio encedon – Acraea encedon
Papilio pinthous – Moschoneura pinthous
Papilio nauplius – Eresia nauplius
Papilio ixilion – [nomen dubium]
Papilio idas – [suppressed]

Sphinx (hawk moths)

Sphinx ocellata – Smerinthus ocellata 
Sphinx populi – Laothoe populi 
Sphinx tiliae – Mimas tiliae 
Sphinx ocypete – Enyo ocypete 
Sphinx nerii – Daphnis nerii 
Sphinx convolvuli – Agrius convolvuli 
Sphinx ligustri – Sphinx ligustri 
Sphinx atropos – Acherontia atropos 
Sphinx caricae – Tatoglossum caricae 
Sphinx celerio – Hippotion celerio 
Sphinx ello – Erinnyis ello 
Sphinx labruscae – Argeus labruscae 
Sphinx ficus – Pachylia ficus 
Sphinx vitis – Eumorpha vitis 
Sphinx elpenor – Deilephila elpenor 
Sphinx porcellus – Deilephila porcellus 
Sphinx euphorbiae – Hyles euphorbiae 
Sphinx alecto – Theretra alecto 
Sphinx megaera – Argeus megaera 
Sphinx pinastri – Sphinx pinastri 
Sphinx tisiphone – Hippotion celerio 
Sphinx thyelia – Xylophanes thyelia 
Sphinx tantalus – Aellopos tantalus 
Sphinx tityus – Hemaris tityus 
Sphinx ixion – Aellopos tantalus 
Sphinx stellatarum – Macroglossum stellatarum 
Sphinx bombyliformis – Hemaris tityus 
Sphinx fuciformis – Hemaris fuciformis 
Sphinx culiciformis – Synanthedon culiciformis 
Sphinx salmachus – Synanthedon tipuliformis 
Sphinx belis – Macroglossum belis 
Sphinx filipendulae – Zygaena filipendulae, six-spot burnet moth 
Sphinx phegea – Syntomis phegea, nine-spotted moth 
Sphinx creusa – Euchromia creusa 
Sphinx polymena – Euchromia polymena 
Sphinx cassandra – Saurita cassandra 
Sphinx pectinicornis – Chalcosia pectinicornis 
Sphinx statices – Adscita statices

Phalaena (moths)

Bombyces

Phalaena atlas – Attacus atlas 
Phalaena hesperus – Rothschildia hesperus 
Phalaena cecropia – Hyalophora cecropia 
Phalaena paphia – Antheraea paphia 
Phalaena luna – Actias luna 
Phalaena pavonia – Saturnia pavonia 
Phalaena tau – Aglia tau 
Phalaena quercifolia
Phalaena ilicifolia – Phyllodesma ilicifolia 
Phalaena pruni – Odonestis pruni 
Phalaena potatoria – Euthrix potatoria 
Phalaena pini – Dendrolimus pini 
Phalaena quercus – Lasiocampa quercus 
Phalaena rubi – Macrothylacia rubi 
Phalaena lanestris – Eriogaster lanestris 
Phalaena vinula – Cerura vinula
Phalaena versicolora – Endromis versicolora 
Phalaena mori – Bombyx mori 
Phalaena neustria  – Malacosoma neustria 
Phalaena castrensis – Malacosoma castrense 
Phalaena catax – Eriogaster catax 
Phalaena processionea – Thaumatopoea processionea
Phalaena caja – Arctia caja
Phalaena virgo – Apantesis virgo
Phalaena villica – Arctia villica
Phalaena plantaginis – Parasemia plantaginis
Phalaena monacha – Lymantria monacha
Phalaena dispar – Lymantria dispar, gypsy moth
Phalaena chrysorrhoea – Euproctis chrysorrhoea
Phalaena salicis – Leucoma salicis
Phalaena crataegi – Trichiura crataegi 
Phalaena striata – Spiris striata
Phalaena populi – Poecilocampa populi 
Phalaena coryli – Colocasia coryli
Phalaena curtula – Clostera curtula
Phalaena pudibunda – Calliteara pudibunda
Phalaena fascelina – Dicallomera fascelina
Phalaena antiqua – Orgyia antiqua
Phalaena caeruleocephala – Diloba caeruleocephala
Phalaena ziczac – Notodonta ziczac
Phalaena cossus – Cossus cossus 
Phalaena fenestra – Hyalurga fenestra
Phalaena perspicua – Pitthea perspicua 
Phalaena odorata – Ascalapha odorata
Phalaena militaris – Dysphaena militaris 
Phalaena purpurata – Rhyparia purpurata
Phalaena aulica – Hyphoraia aulica
Phalaena lubricipeda – Spilosoma lubricipedum
Phalaena sannio – Diacrisia sannio
Phalaena anastomosis – Clostera anastomosis
Phalaena graminis – Cerapteryx graminis
Phalaena lusoria – Lygephila lusoria
Phalaena grammica – Spiris grammica
Phalaena cribraria – Coscinia cribraria
Phalaena celsia – Staurophora celsia
Phalaena libatrix – Scoliopteryx libatrix
Phalaena capucina  – Ptilodon capucinus
Phalaena camelina – Ptilodon camelinus
Phalaena oo – Dicycla oo
Phalaena rufina – Agrochola rufina
Phalaena helvola – Agrochola helvola

Noctuae

Phalaena strix – Xyleutes strix 
Phalaena fagi – Stauropus fagi
Phalaena bucephala – Phalera bucephala
Phalaena hecta – Phymatopus hecta
Phalaena humuli – Hepialus humuli 
Phalaena lupulina – Hepialus lupulinus 
Phalaena lunus – Nothus lunus 
Phalaena crepuscularis – Erebus crepuscularis
Phalaena occidua – Erebus occiduus
Phalaena punctigera – Cacyparis punctigera
Phalaena dominula – Callimorpha dominula
Phalaena matronula – Pericallia matronula
Phalaena fuliginosa – Phragmatobia fuliginosa
Phalaena fulvia – Chionaema fulvium
Phalaena batis – Thyatira batis 
Phalaena trapezina – Cosmia trapezina
Phalaena lucernea – Standfussiana lucernea
Phalaena pellex – Utetheisa pellex
Phalaena glyphica – Euclidia glyphica
Phalaena pallens – Mythimna pallens
Phalaena russula – Diacrisia russula
Phalaena leporina – Acronicta leporina
Phalaena ornatrix – Utetheisa ornatrix
Phalaena jacobaeae – Tyria jacobaeae
Phalaena heliconia – Asota heliconia
Phalaena rubricollis – Atolmis rubricollis
Phalaena quadra – Lithosia quadra
Phalaena complana – Eilema complanum
Phalaena pacta – Catocala pacta
Phalaena pronuba – Noctua pronuba
Phalaena maura – Mormo maura
Phalaena fraxini – Catocala fraxini
Phalaena chrysitis – Diachrysia chrysitis
Phalaena gamma – Autographa gamma
Phalaena interrogationis – Syngrapha interrogationis
Phalaena jota – Autographa jota
Phalaena festucae – Plusia festucae
Phalaena meticulosa – Phlogophora meticulosa
Phalaena psi – Acronicta psi
Phalaena chi – Antitype chi
Phalaena aceris – Acronicta aceris
Phalaena aprilina – Dichonia aprilina
Phalaena ludifica – Trichosea ludifica
Phalaena occulta – Eurois occultus
Phalaena conspicillaris – Egira conspicillaris
Phalaena umbratica – Cucullia umbratica
Phalaena exsoleta – Xylena exsoleta
Phalaena verbasci – Cucullia verbasci
Phalaena exclamationis – Agrotis exclamationis
Phalaena gothica – Orthosia gothica
Phalaena scabriuscula – Dipterygia scabriuscula
Phalaena strigilis – Oligia strigilis
Phalaena C nigrum – Xestia c-nigrum
Phalaena brassicae – Mamestra brassicae
Phalaena rumicis – Acronicta rumicis
Phalaena oxyacanthae – Allophyes oxyacanthae
Phalaena oleracea – Lacanobia oleracea
Phalaena pisi – Melanchra pisi
Phalaena atriplicis – Trachea atriplicis
Phalaena praecox – Actebia praecox
Phalaena triplasia – Abrostola triplasia
Phalaena pyramidea – Amphipyra pyramidea
Phalaena flavicornis – Achlya flavicornis 
Phalaena leucomelas – Aedia leucomelas
Phalaena typica – Naenia typica
Phalaena lucipara – Euplexia lucipara
Phalaena delphinii – Periphanes delphinii
Phalaena citrago – Xanthia citrago
Phalaena secalis – Mesapamea secalis

Geometrae

Phalaena lactearia – Jodis lactearia
Phalaena falcataria – Drepana falcataria
Phalaena sambucaria – Ourapteryx sambucaria
Phalaena lacertinaria – Falcaria lacertinaria
Phalaena alniaria – Ennomos alniaria
Phalaena syringaria – Apeira syringaria
Phalaena prunaria – Angerona prunaria
Phalaena piniaria – Bupalus piniaria
Phalaena tiliaria
Phalaena vulpinaria – synonym of Diacrisia sannio 
Phalaena elinguaria – Crocallis elinguaria
Phalaena melanaria – Arichanna melanaria
Phalaena macularia – Pseudopanthera macularia
Phalaena atomaria – Ematurga atomaria
Phalaena pulveraria – Plagodis pulveraria
Phalaena fasciaria – Hylaea fasciaria
Phalaena betularia – Biston betularia
Phalaena scopularia – Calliteara scopularia 
Phalaena wauaria – Macaria wauaria
Phalaena tentacularia – Polypogon tentacularius 
Phalaena purpuraria – Lythria purpuraria
Phalaena prosapiaria
Phalaena punctaria – Cyclophora punctaria
Phalaena teutonaria
Phalaena pusaria – Cabera pusaria
Phalaena papilionaria – Geometra papilionaria
Phalaena tripunctaria – Nyctemera tripunctaria 
Phalaena tricinctaria
Phalaena jatropharia
Phalaena viridata – Chlorissa viridata
Phalaena putata – Jodis putata
Phalaena notata – Macaria notata
Phalaena amata
Phalaena repandata – Alcis repandata
Phalaena dubitata – Triphosa dubitata
Phalaena emarginata – Idaea emarginata
Phalaena atrata – Odezia atrata
Phalaena clathrata – Chiasmia clathrata
Phalaena undulata – Hydria undulata
Phalaena flaveolata
Phalaena aestuata
Phalaena grossulariata – Abraxas grossulariata
Phalaena luteolata – Opisthograptis luteolata
Phalaena populata – Eulithis populata
Phalaena bilineata – Camptogramma bilineata
Phalaena chenopodiata – Scotopteryx chenopodiata
Phalaena comitata – Pelurga comitata
Phalaena dotata
Phalaena plagiata – Aplocera plagiata
Phalaena miata – Chloroclysta miata
Phalaena prunata – Eulithis prunata
Phalaena aversata – Idaea aversata
Phalaena tristata – Epirrhoe tristata
Phalaena alchemillata – Perizoma alchemillata
Phalaena hastata – Rheumaptera hastata
Phalaena albicillata – Mesoleuca albicillata
Phalaena marginata – Lomaspilis marginata
Phalaena ocellata – Cosmorhoe ocellata
Phalaena janata – Achaea janata 
Phalaena fluctuata – Xanthorhoe fluctuata
Phalaena juniperata – Thera juniperata
Phalaena incanata – Scopula incanata
Phalaena immutata – Scopula immutata
Phalaena immorata – Scopula immorata
Phalaena remutata
Phalaena succenturiata – Eupithecia succenturiata
Phalaena strigilata – Pechipogo strigilata 
Phalaena didymata – Mesotype didymata
Phalaena rectangulata – Pasiphila rectangulata
Phalaena hortulata – Eurrhypara hortulata 
Phalaena nymphaeata – Nymphula nymphaeata 
Phalaena potamogata – Nymphula potamogata 
Phalaena stratiotata – Parapoynx stratiotata 
Phalaena lemnata – Cataclysta lemnata 
Phalaena cingulata – Pyrausta cingulata 
Phalaena brumata – Operophtera brumata

Tortrices

Phalaena prasinana – Pseudoips prasinanus 
Phalaena viridana – Tortrix viridana
Phalaena literana – Acleris literana
Phalaena hamana – Agapeta hamana
Phalaena fuscana – synonym of Pseudosciaphila branderiana
Phalaena oporana – Archips oporana
Phalaena rosana – Archips rosana
Phalaena xylosteana – Archips xylosteana
Phalaena avellana – Archips avellana
Phalaena ameriana – Archips ameriana
Phalaena piceana – Archips piceana
Phalaena ministrana – Eulia ministrana
Phalaena rurinana – Clepsis rurinana
Phalaena uddmanniana – Epiblema uddmanniana
Phalaena lecheana – Ptycholoma lecheana
Phalaena branderiana – Pseudosciaphila branderiana
Phalaena forsskåleana – Croesia forsskaleana
Phalaena loeflingiana – Aleimma loeflingiana
Phalaena bergmanniana – Croesia bergmanniana
Phalaena holmiana – Croesia holmiana
Phalaena rolandriana – Clepsis rolandriana
Phalaena solandriana – Epinotia solandriana
Phalaena hastiana – Acleris hastiana
Phalaena wahlbomiana – Pseudosciaphila wahlbomiana
Phalaena lediana – Olethreutes lediana
Phalaena heracliana – Agonopterix heracliana

Pyrales

Phalaena farinalis – Pyralis farinalis
Phalaena glaucinalis – Orthopygia glaucinalis
Phalaena proboscidalis – Hypena proboscidalis
Phalaena rostralis – Hypena rostralis
Phalaena forficalis – Evergestis forficalis
Phalaena verticalis – Sitochroa verticalis
Phalaena pinguinalis – Aglossa pinguinalis
Phalaena purpuralis – Pyrausta purpuralis

Tineae

Phalaena sociella – Aphomia sociella
Phalaena colonella – Aphomia colonella
Phalaena pusiella – Ethmia pusiella
Phalaena bella – Utetheisa bella
Phalaena pulchella – Utetheisa pulchella
Phalaena evonymella – Yponomeuta evonymella
Phalaena padella – Yponomeuta padella
Phalaena irrorella – Setina irrorella
Phalaena lutarella – Eilema lutarella
Phalaena mesomella – Cybosia mesomella
Phalaena pascuella – Crambus pascuella
Phalaena pratella – Crambus pratella
Phalaena culmella – Chrysoteuchia culmella
Phalaena nemorella – Ypsolopha nemorella
Phalaena foenella – Epiblema foenella
Phalaena unguicella – Ancylis unguicella
Phalaena salicella – Hedya salicella
Phalaena cynosbatella – Epiblema cynosbatella
Phalaena vestianella – Coleophora vestianella
Phalaena tapetzella – Trichophaga tapetzella
Phalaena pellionella – Tinea pellionella
Phalaena sarcitrella – Endrosis sarcitrella
Phalaena minutella – Borkhausenia minutella
Phalaena mellonella – Galleria mellonella
Phalaena cucullatella – Nola cucullatella
Phalaena granella – Nemapogon granella
Phalaena lappella – Metzneria lappella
Phalaena proletella – Aleyrodes proletella
Phalaena arbutella – Olethreutes arbutella
Phalaena tessella – Pseudotelphusa tessella
Phalaena vittella – Ypsolopha vittella
Phalaena xylostella – Plutella xylostella
Phalaena trigonella – Epinotia trigonella
Phalaena rhomboidella – Hypatima rhomboidella
Phalaena tertianella – [nomen dubium]
Phalaena mercurella – Eudonia mercurella
Phalaena pomonella – Cydia pomonella
Phalaena strobilella – Cydia strobilella
Phalaena pinella – Catoptria pinella
Phalaena turionella – Blastesthia turionella
Phalaena dodecella – Exoteleia dodecella
Phalaena resinella – Petrova resinella
Phalaena fuscella – Niditinea fuscella
Phalaena corticella – Lampronia corticella
Phalaena stipella – Schiffermuelleria stipella
Phalaena gemmella – Stenolechia gemmella
Phalaena bractella – Oecophora bractella
Phalaena ramella – Epinotia ramella
Phalaena porrectella – Plutella porrectella
Phalaena petiverella – Dichrorampha petiverella
Phalaena swammerdamella – Nematopogon swammerdamella
Phalaena reaumurella – Adela reaumurella
Phalaena De Geerella – Nemophora degeerella
Phalaena mouffetella – Athrips mouffetella
Phalaena listerella – Solenobia listerella
Phalaena frischella – Coleophora frischella
Phalaena albinella – Dichrorampha albinella
Phalaena goedartella – Argyresthia goedartella
Phalaena merianella – synonym of Eulamprotes wilkella
Phalaena wilkella – Eulamprotes wilkella
Phalaena lyonnetella – [nomen dubium]
Phalaena bonnetella – Argyresthia bonnetella
Phalaena schaefferella – Schiffermuelleria schaefferella
Phalaena roesella – Heliodines roesella
Phalaena rajella – Phyllonorycter rajella
Phalaena clerkella – Lyonetia clerkella

Alucitae

Phalaena monodactyla – Emmelina monodactyla
Phalaena didactyla – Geina didactyla
Phalaena tridactyla – Pterophorus tridactyla
Phalaena tetradactyla – Pterophorus tetradactyla
Phalaena pentadactyla – Pterophorus pentadactyla
Phalaena hexadactyla – Alucita hexadactyla

Footnotes

References

Systema Naturae
 Systema Naturae, Lepidoptera